Waverley is a rural/residential locality in the local government area (LGA) of Launceston in the Launceston LGA region of Tasmania. The 2016 census recorded a population of 1501 for the state suburb of Waverley.
It is a suburb of Launceston.

It is an eastern suburb; the location of Waverley Woollen Mills, and the Waverley primary school.

It is the first suburb to pass through when visiting Launceston from the east coast via the Tasman Highway.

History 
Waverley was gazetted as a locality in 1956.

Geography
Almost all of the boundaries are survey lines.

Road infrastructure 
Route A3 (Tasman Highway) runs through from south to west.

References

Suburbs of Launceston, Tasmania
Localities of City of Launceston